305 may refer to:
 305 (number)
 305 AD, a year
 305 BC, a year

Electronics and machines
 IBM 305 RAMAC, the first commercial computer to use a hard disk drive
 Lenovo IdeaPad 305, a brand of small business professional notebook computers
 Nokia Asha 305, a Full Touch phone

Entertainment

Film
 305 (film), a 2008 mockumentary about a group of semi-courageous Spartans

Music
 Bass 305, a band
 Mr. 305, nickname for the rapper Pitbull
 Mr. 305 Inc., a record label company
 Welcome to the 305, an album by Pitbull

Rides
 Intimidator 305, a roller coaster at Kings Dominion theme park

Sports
 The 305 MVP, nickname for the wrestler Montel Vontavious Porter (MVP)

Literacy
 Lectionary 305, a Greek manuscript
 Minuscule 305, a Greek manuscript

Military

Military units
 305th Division (disambiguation), several units
 305 Squadron (disambiguation), several units
 305th Infantry Brigade (United Kingdom)

United States
 305th Air Mobility Wing
 305th Military Intelligence Battalion (United States)
 305th Cavalry Regiment (United States)
 305th Operations Group

Military vehicles
 , a Type-VIIC U-boat

United States
 , a Balao-class submarine
 , an Admirable-class minesweeper
 , a Clemson-class destroyer

Places
 305 Jefferson Street
 Area code 305, area code for Miami
 Salina USD 305, a school district in Kansas

Science and technology

Astronomy
 305 Gordonia, an asteroid
 3C 305, a radio galaxy in Draco
 Hill 305, a land feature on the Moon
 Kosmos 305, a Soviet unmanned space mission attempt
 NGC 305, a asterism in Pisces

Technology
 HTTP 305

Transportation

Automobiles
 Peugeot 305, a French compact car lineup

Engines
 GM 305 V8, a small block engine

Helicopter
 Brantly 305, an American light helicopter

Roads and routes
 List of highways numbered 305
 Flight 305

Trains
 305 series, a Japanese train type
 British Rail Class 305, a British train type